The Williamson Swamp Creek is a  tributary of the Ogeechee River in the U.S. state of Georgia.

See also
List of rivers of Georgia

References 

USGS Hydrologic Unit Map - State of Georgia (1974)

Rivers of Georgia (U.S. state)
Rivers of Washington County, Georgia
Rivers of Jefferson County, Georgia